“Mirie it is while sumer ilast” (“Merry it is while summer ylast”) is a Middle English song of the first half of the 13th century. It is about the longing for summer in the face of the approaching cold weather. It is one of the oldest songs in the English language, and one of the few examples of non-liturgical music from medieval England. The manuscript was found together with two old French songs in a book of Psalms in the Bodleian Library. It was rediscovered at the end of the 19th century and made accessible to experts in 1901. It was arranged and published in a modern form for the first time by Frank Llewellyn Harrison.

The text and melody are incomplete on a single, damaged manuscript page, which, together with the somewhat ambiguous notation, makes it difficult to reconstruct the song in whole. It is unclear whether the song originally contained additional lines or stanzas, which Harrison considers probable, nor can the final word be conclusively determined. The author of the song is also unknown, although by its inclusion with two other French love songs pasted in a Book of Psalms, Nicholson proposes that the manuscript was written by  lay chorister. The context of the piece also may suggest the surviving leaf was originally included in a French chansonnier, suggesting an origin in the French tradition.

Words
Middle English

Modern Spelling

Modern English

Melody

See also
 Sumer is icumen in, another 13th century medieval English song on a related theme.

References

Middle English poems
Works of uncertain authorship
Medieval compositions